Shoaymat-e Seh (also Romanized as Sho‘aymaţ-e Seh) is a village in Anaqcheh Rural District, in the Central District of Ahvaz County, Khuzestan Province, Iran. At the 2006 census, its population was 35, in 5 families.

References 

Populated places in Ahvaz County